Shih Kuei-chun is a Taiwanese male badminton player. He was born in Pingtung County, and in 2014 he became the finalist of the Chinese Taipei national badminton championships in the men's singles event. He lose to Hsu Jen-hao with the score 1-2. He also the semifinalist of the 2014 Canada Open Grand Prix tournament. In 2016, he became the runner-up of the Maurice's Pools and Spas Waikato International tournament in the men's singles event.

Achievements

BWF International Challenge/Series
Men's Singles

 BWF International Challenge tournament
 BWF International Series tournament
 BWF Future Series tournament

References

External links
 
 

Living people
Year of birth missing (living people)
People from Pingtung County
Taiwanese male badminton players